Malik Agar (born  Nganyofa Agar Eyre Nganyofa) is a Sudanese politician and insurgent leader active in the insurgency in Blue Nile state.

Early life
Malik Agar was born Nganyofa Agar Eyre Nganyofa to an Ingessana chief in Blue Nile State. He did not know he was a Muslim until he was eight. His headteacher gave him the name "Malik" and told him he was a Muslim. From that day on, he was called "Malik Agar Eyre."

Second Sudanese Civil War
Agar joined the Sudanese armed opposition shortly after the beginning of the Second Sudanese Civil War in 1983.

In the 1990s, he was the commander of a section of the Sudan People's Liberation Movement (SPLM) military forces along the Ethiopia-Sudan border south of the Blue Nile to Geissan. SPLM units under his command captured the towns of Kurmuk and Qaissan in 1997.

Agar was close to John Garang, and shared his goal of overthrowing the Sudanese government, as opposed to fighting for the secession of South Sudan. After Garang's death, Agar, along with others who shared a desire for a revolution in Sudan, were marginalised by the new SPLM leadership. Agar expressed his disapproval of the secession of South Sudan to a US official in 2009, stating that it would cause the eventual splintering of the rest of Sudan.

Post-Civil War
He was elected governor of Blue Nile State in the Republic of the Sudan in April 2010. Agar was one of the few high-profile members of the Sudanese opposition to run in the election, and was the only non-NCP candidate to win a governorship. Agar defeated the NCP candidate, Farah Ibrahim Mohamed Al-Aggar, by 108,119 to 99,417 votes.

In February 2011 Malik Agar also became chairman of the Sudan People's Liberation Movement (northern sector), the part of the SPLM that operates in northern Sudan. The SPLM-NS became a separate political party when Southern Sudan seceded from the Republic of Sudan in July 2011.

On 2 September, Agar was deposed as governor on the orders of President Omar al-Bashir. He fled to the southern part of the state and is reportedly planning a counterattack. He has warned that the Sudan–SPLM conflict may ignite a wider Sudanese civil war.

In February 2012 Agar helped found the Sudanese Revolutionary Front; a coalition of Sudanese opposition groups that aims to overthrow the Sudanese government and replace it with a democracy. In February 2012, Agar was elected president of the Sudanese Revolutionary Front (SRF).

On 2 February 2021, he was appointed as a member of the Sovereignty Council of Sudan.

Ideology
Agar rejects President Omar al-Bashir's vision of an Arab-Islamic state, and has argued instead for a multicultural civil democracy.

References

External Links 

Living people
Members of the Sovereignty Council of Sudan
People from Blue Nile (state)
Sudan People's Liberation Movement politicians
Sudanese Muslims
Sudan Revolutionary Front politicians
Year of birth missing (living people)